The West Coast Stock Car Hall Of Fame is a Hall of Fame for people associated with late-model stock car racing on the West Coast of the United States. Many NASCAR Grand National Division, West Series champions are inducted in the Hall of Fame. The Hall of Fame once had a physical location at Toyota Speedway at Irwindale, in Irwindale, California. Today, it is a digital hall of fame located online (Official website) and inductees are honored at an annual banquet, according to the official website.

History
The hall of fame was created in 2001. Nominees are either retired, deceased or have moved from one area of participation to another, or have been active in their primary field for at least 25 years. The first class was inducted in 2002.

Board of directors
 Dave Allen
 John Bickford
 Melissa Bleier
 Ken Clapp
 Ray Claridge
 Julie Giese
 Frank Gullum
 Bill McAnally
 Ed Justice Jr.
 Owen A. Kearns
 Tony LaRussa
 Bill McAnally
 Dennis Mattish
 Joe Nava
 Steve Page
 Larree Renda
 Ralph Sheheen
 Richard Spencer
 Bryan R. Sperber
 Kenny Takeuchi
 Mike Verlatti
 Mike Verlatti Jr.
 Wayne Wells
Richard Woodland

Council:
 Donald Ornelas Jr. of Agajanian, McFall, Weiss, Tetreault & Crist LLP

List of inductees

2002

Christopher J.C. Agajanian
Bruce Alexander
Bill Amick
Bob Barkhimer
Scott Hunter Cain
Cos Cancilla
Ken Clapp
Ernie Conn
Charlie Curryer
Carl Dane
Jim Dane
Lloyd Dane
Ray Elder
Lou Figaro
Eddie Gray
Ron Hornaday Sr. (father of Ron Hornaday Jr.)
Jimmy Insolo
Parnelli Jones
Danny Letner
Jack McCoy
Hershel McGriff
Marvin Panch
Marvin Porter
Les Richter
Jim Robinson
Troy Ruttman
Bill Schmitt
Roy Smith
John Soares

2003
Bob Beadle
Dick Bown
Margo Burke
Sonny Easley
Erick Erickson
Shav Glick
Dan Gurney
Rajo Jack
Eddie Pagan
Frank Phillips
Bob Ross
Rodger Ward

2004
Frank Galpin
George Jefferson
Johnny Mantz
Parky Nall
Bill Sedgwick
Clay Smith

2005
Allen Adkins
Ron Ail
Marion Collins
Richard Elder
Robert Estes
Tom Hamilton
Sam Hanks
Ernie Irvan
Floyd Johnson
Dick Meyer
Vel Miletich
Leon Ruther
Harry Schilling
Len Sutton

2006
Ivan Baldwin
Ray Claridge
Jim Cook
Mike Curb
Walt Faulkner
Beryl Jackson
John Kieper
Gary Nelson
Don Noel
Jim Rush

2009
The hall of fame inducted its sixth class in 2009.
Chuck Bown
Rick Carelli
Joe and John Fernandez
Doug George
Ben Gregory
Bert Letner
Chuck Meekins
Dick Rathmann
Wayne Spears
Art Watts

2010
The hall of fame inducted its seventh class in 2010.
Allen Beebe
Sean Boyan
Bob Caswell
Mike Chase
Bill "Tiny" Clinton
Duane Edwards
Mel Fernandes
Joe Mangini Jr.
Mel Larson
Gordon Martin
Herb Nab
Rod Osterlund
James "Jimmy" Smith

2011
The hall of fame inducted its eighth class in 2011.
Cary Agajanian	
Marvin Burke
Owen Kearn	
Louis Mangini
Roger McCluskey
Chuck Parkko	
Al Schmidhammer	
George Seeger
Chuck Stevenson	
Tim Williamson
Joe Ruttman

2012
The hall of fame inducted its ninth class in 2012.

Historic Class (1930-1970)
The Justice Brothers
B.L. Marchbanks
Bob Phillipi
Fred Steinbroner

Modern Class (1971-Today)
Butch Gilliland
Vic Kurten
Bill McAnally
Pat McElreath

2013
The hall of fame inducted its tenth class on June 20, 2013.

Ron Hornaday Jr.
Chad Little
Derrike Cope
Randy Lynch
Buddy Jobe

2014

 Bob Bondurant
 Marshall Chesrown
 Ron Eaton
 Steve Page
 Mike Skinner

2015

 Jerry Baxter
 John Cardinale
 Jason Leffler
 Warren Razore
 Doug Richert
 Jim Williams

2016

 John Bickford
 Mike Duncan
 Johnny Key
 Al Pombo
 Jim Thirkettle

2017

 Walker Evans
 Michael Gaughan
 Joe Leonard
 Gene Price
 Scott Pruett
 Frank Secrist
 Kenneth (Kenny) Takeuchi

2018

 Freddie Agabashian
 Larry Albedi
 George Bignotti
 William (Bill) Cheesbourg Jr.
 Joe Garone
 Clyde Prickett
 Oren Prosser
 Greg Pursley
 Bryan R. Sperber
 Marion Lee (Mickey) Thompson
 Richard (Dick) Woodland

See also
West Coast of the United States

References

External links
Official website

Auto racing museums and halls of fame
Halls of fame in California
Stock car racing
Sports in Los Angeles County, California
Sports hall of fame inductees
Irwindale, California
Awards established in 2001
2001 establishments in California